Dmitry Vyacheslavovich Bystrov (born 30 July 1967; died 1 June 2005 of pneumonia) was a Soviet and Russian professional footballer and coach.

Honours
 Soviet Top League champion: 1991.
 Soviet Top League runner-up: 1990.
 Soviet Cup winner: 1991.
 Soviet Cup runner-up: 1990.
 Russian Cup runner-up: 1993, 1994.
 Uzbek League bronze: 1997.

European club competitions
With PFC CSKA Moscow.

 European Cup Winners' Cup 1991–92: 2 games.
 UEFA Champions League 1992–93: 7 games.
 UEFA Cup Winners' Cup 1994–95: 1 game.

References

External links
 

1967 births
Footballers from Moscow
2005 deaths
Soviet footballers
Association football defenders
Russian footballers
Russian expatriate footballers
Expatriate footballers in Uzbekistan
Expatriate footballers in Kazakhstan
FC Lokomotiv Moscow players
PFC CSKA Moscow players
Soviet Top League players
Russian Premier League players
FC Zenit Saint Petersburg players
FC Shinnik Yaroslavl players
FC Lokomotiv Nizhny Novgorod players
FC Asmaral Moscow players
Russian football managers
Deaths from pneumonia in Russia
Navbahor Namangan players
FC Asmaral Moscow managers
FC Kyzylzhar players
FC Metallurg Lipetsk players
Russian expatriate sportspeople in Kazakhstan